Doonside Roos Rugby League Football Club is an Australian rugby league football club based in Doonside, New South Wales formed in 1968.

Notable Juniors
Notable First Grade Players that have played at Doonside Roos include:
Jarrod Sammut (2007- Penrith, Celtic, Bradford, Wakefield, London & Wigan)
Andrew Fifita (2010- Wests Tigers & Cronulla Sharks)
Tim Simona (2011-2016 Wests Tigers)
Blake Austin (2011- Penrith Panthers, Wests Tigers & Canberra Raiders)
David Fifita (2014- Cronulla Sharks)
Latu Fifita (2015-16 Workington Town)
Josh Addo-Carr (2016- Melbourne Storm & Wests Tigers)

See also

List of rugby league clubs in Australia
Rugby league in New South Wales

References

External links
 Official website

Rugby league teams in Sydney
Rugby clubs established in 1968
1968 establishments in Australia